The Belgium men's national under-16 basketball team is a national basketball team of Belgium, administered by the Basketball Belgium. It represents the country in men's international under-16 basketball competitions.

FIBA U16 European Championship participations

See also
Belgium men's national basketball team
Belgium men's national under-18 basketball team
Belgium women's national under-17 basketball team

References

External links
Official website
Archived records of Belgium team participations

Men's national under-16 basketball teams
Basketball